Marie Reynoard, born in Bastia (Haute-Corse) on October 28, 1897, and died in Ravensbrück (Germany) on January 30, 1945, was a heroine of the Grenoble Resistance during the Second World War.

Biography 
A brilliant student, she joined the prestigious École normale supérieure de jeunes filles (Sèvres); in 1921, she taught in Cahors and then in Marseilles, before being appointed in 1936 to the Lycée Stendhal in Grenoble.

Despite a fragile health which forced her to take rest cures in the mountains, she joined the Resistance in 1940 by founding the resistance movement Vérité. During a trip to Marseilles, she met Henri Frenay, leader of the National Liberation Movement. She brought together the first resistance fighters in Grenoble in her small apartment at 4 rue Joseph-Fourier. At the end of November 1941, in the presence of Henri Frenay and François de Menthon, the Vérité et Liberté movements merged under the name of French Liberation then Combat, which also became the name of the clandestine newspaper of the network.

She then took over the departmental leadership of the Combat movement. Marie Reynoard began by distributing leaflets from Lyon.

Arrest 
she was arrested in May 1943 in Lyon by Jean Multon, a collaborator of Klaus Barbie at the Gestapo.

Tributes 
In Grenoble, a commemorative plaque at the Lycée Stendhal, where she taught, has been installed, as well as at her home.

A kindergarten and an avenue in Grenoble bear her name since 1968, a residence for students since September 2013.Also bear her name in the Grenoble region, a high school in Villard-Bonnot and the hall of the eco-district of Gières since 2016.

A school in Bastia (Haute-Corse), her birthplace, bears her name.

Decorations 
Resistance Medal, 24 April,1946

Bibliography 
 Fernand Garnier, Marie Reynoard, Press university of Grenoble, 1995

References 

Ravensbrück concentration camp prisoners
1897 births
1945 deaths
History of Grenoble
People who died in Ravensbrück concentration camp